Khatunabad (also romanized as Khātūnābād) is a city in the Central District of Shahr-e Babak County, Kerman Province, Iran.  At the 2006 census, its population was 3,883, in 900 families.

References

Populated places in Shahr-e Babak County

Cities in Kerman Province